Lindholm is a Swedish surname, meaning "Linden Islet". People with the surname include:

 Aarne Lindholm (1889–1972), Finnish long-distance runner
 Anna-Kari Lindholm (born 1976), Swedish curler
 Berit Lindholm (born 1934), Swedish opera singer
 Berndt Lindholm (1841–1914), Finnish painter
 Brita Lindholm (born 1963), Swedish curler
 Charles Lindholm (born 1946), American anthropologist
 Elias Lindholm (born 1994), Swedish ice hockey forward
 Eric Lindholm (1890–1957), Swedish athlete
 Garrett Lindholm (born 1988), American footballer
 Gun-Mari Lindholm (born 1962), Ålands politician
 Gunnar Lindholm (1887–1972), Swedish fencer
 Hampus Lindholm (born 1994), Swedish ice hockey defenceman
 Henna Lindholm (born 1989), Finnish ice dancer
 Inge Lindholm, (1892–1932), Swedish athlete
 Jan Lindholm (born 1951), Swedish Green Party politician
 Karl Lindholm (1860–1917), Russian sailor
 Kirsten Lindholm (born 1943), Danish actor
 Leila Lindholm (born 1975), Swedish chef
 Mathilda Lindholm (born 1995), Finnish badminton player
 Megan Lindholm (Robin Hobb) (born 1952), American writer
 Mikael Lindholm (born 1964), Swedish hockey player
 Morten ‘Morts’ Lindholm (born 1981) 
Danish/British Adventurer and Polar Travel Professional
 Olli Lindholm (born 1964), Finnish singer, also lead vocalist for Finnish band Yö
 Peja Lindholm (born 1970), Swedish curler
 Per Lindholm (born 1953), Swedish wrestler
 Philip Lindholm, American singer/songwriter, actor, filmmaker, and academic
 Raimo Lindholm (1931–2017), Finnish basketball player
 Robert M. Lindholm (born 1935), American photographer
 Sebastian Lindholm (born 1961), Finnish rally driver
 Sven Olov Lindholm (1903–1998), Swedish Nazi leader
 Tobias Lindholm (born 1977), Danish screenwriter
 Tommy Lindholm (born 1947), Finnish footballer and coach
 Tyler Lindholm, American politician
 Vasiliy Lindholm (1874–1935), Russian zoologist, malacologist and herpetologist
 Veronica Lindholm (born 1984), Swedish politician

Swedish-language surnames